Black culture refers to:
 African-American culture

See also 
 African-American Research Library and Cultural Center
 Black Cultural Archives
 Black Cultural Association
 Black Cultural Centre for Nova Scotia
 Natchez Museum of African American History and Culture
 National Afro-American Museum and Cultural Center
 National Museum of African American History and Culture
 Organization of Black American Culture
 Reginald F. Lewis Museum of Maryland African American History & Culture
 Schomburg Center for Research in Black Culture
 Sonja Haynes Stone Center for Black Culture and History